Moriz Nähr (born 4 August 1859 in Vienna; died 29 June 1945 in Vienna) was an Austrian photographer. Nähr was a friend of the members of the Vienna Secession art group. He is best known for his portraits of Gustav Klimt, Gustav Mahler, and Ludwig Wittgenstein.

Portraits

References

Further reading
 Václav Macek: The History of European Photography. 1900-1938, Bratislava 2010, .

External links
A lengthy exchange over the copyright of some Wittgenstein images that contains some data on Nähr at the very bottom.
 European Society for the History of Photography on Moriz Nähr
 Moriz Nähr Catalogue Raisonné

1859 births
1945 deaths
Austrian photographers